
The Avia BH-7 was a prototype fighter aircraft built in Czechoslovakia in 1923.  It was a parasol-wing monoplane developed in tandem with, and as an alternative to the BH-6, which shared its fuselage and tail design. Like the BH-6, the BH-7 was involved in a number of serious crashes during its test programme, which led to its abandonment as a fighter. Undaunted, however, Avia used the design as the basis for a racing aircraft, shortening the wingspan by 1.4 m (4 ft 7 in), fairing the wing directly onto the top of the fuselage and dispensing with the cabane struts. This revised version was designated BH-7B and the fighter (retrospectively) as the BH-7A. When the design proved no more successful as a racer, it was finally put to rest.

Specifications

See also

References

 
 
 Němeček, V. (1968). Československá letadla. Praha: Naše Vojsko.
 airwar.ru

Single-engined tractor aircraft
Parasol-wing aircraft
1920s Czechoslovakian fighter aircraft
BH-07